Venus festival can mean:

 the Veneralia, an ancient Roman festival
 the Venus Theater Festival for women playwrights
 the Venus Berlin trade fair